The Embassy of Egypt is Egypt's embassy in Canada. It is located at 150 Metcalfe Street Suite 1100 in Ottawa, Ontario. Ahmed Hafez serves as Ambassador with a staff of diplomats plus locally hired employees. Egypt also operates a significant Consulate-General in Montreal with 14 accredited diplomatic personnel.

References

External links

Canada-Egypt Relations - Government of Canada 
 Canadian embassy in Cairo - Government of Canada 
Embassy of Egypt  - Embassy of Egypt 
Egypt Consulate - Egypt Consulate (in Arabic)
Egypt Consulate Visa Application for Canadians - Egypt Consulate Visa Application for Canadians

Egypt
Ottawa
Canada–Egypt relations